Max Carver (born Robert Maxwell Martensen Jr; August 1, 1988) is an American actor. He is known for his role as Preston Scavo in the ABC television series Desperate Housewives, as Aiden on the MTV teen-horror drama Teen Wolf, and in the first season of the HBO series The Leftovers; his twin brother Charlie Carver portrayed the twin of his characters in all three shows.

Early life and education

Max Carver was born in San Francisco, California, on August 1, 1988. His identical twin brother Charles was born seven minutes earlier on July 31. Before he began acting professionally, he was known as Max Martensen. His father was physician, historian, and author Robert Martensen, and his mother, Anne Carver, is a philanthropist and community activist. In 1992, Anne and her new husband Denis Sutro moved the family to Calistoga in Napa Valley. Max attended high school at St. Paul’s School in Concord, New Hampshire, from which he graduated in 2007. In 2012, he graduated from the University of Southern California with a bachelor's degree in English.

Career
His acting debut was with his brother in the ABC television series, Desperate Housewives; they played Preston and Porter Scavo, sons to Lynette Scavo and Tom Scavo. He and his brother appeared in season 3 of MTV's Teen Wolf as a pair of twin werewolves – Max played Aiden, and Charlie played Ethan. They next appeared in the first season of HBO series The Leftovers.

Carver has also acted separately from his brother. He has guest starred on shows such as The Office, Good Luck Charlie, Victorious, and Best Friends Forever. He had a cameo role in the 2014 comedy Mantervention, playing Lifeguard Joe.  He made his principal film debut in 2014 in Ask Me Anything, co-starring with Britt Robertson, Justin Long, and Martin Sheen.

Filmography

Awards and nominations

References

External links

Living people
American male television actors
Identical twin male actors
21st-century American male actors
Male actors from San Francisco
American twins
1988 births